Ghosted may refer to:
Ghosted (TV series), an American TV series
Ghosted (2011 film), a British film
Ghosted (2023 film), an American romantic action adventure film
Ghosted (comics), comic book series created by Joshua Williamson
Ghosted, stage name of TMS, an English songwriting and record production team
Ghosting (behavior)